Kwong Tong Cemetery is the largest and oldest cemetery located in Bukit Petaling, Kuala Lumpur, Malaysia. It covers an approximate area of 333 acres of land and is the final resting place of many notable pioneers in Malaysia. In 2007, the 112-year-old cemetery was named a Heritage Park.

Notable graves

Kapitan Cina of Kuala Lumpur
 Kapitan Yap Ah Loy (1837–1885)
 Kapitan Yap Kwan Seng (1846–1902)

Memorials

Nanyang Volunteers Memorial
Beside individual graves, the Kwong Tong Cemetery also has a memorial. The Nanyang Volunteers Memorial, which was erected in 1947, honors the contributions of some 3,200 volunteers from Nanyang, modern-day South East Asia. These men and women served as drivers and mechanics for the Chinese during the Second Sino-Japanese War, helping the transportation of war materials into China. These men and women, known collectively as the Nanyang Volunteers, served from February to September 1939.

The Japanese War Memorial
Occupying 10,000 square feet, this memorial site is a mass grave of those killed during the Japanese occupation. The remains of nearly a thousand victims were exhumed from the Tomb of War Victims of the Compatriots of the Republic of China and relocated here.

References

Cemeteries in Kuala Lumpur
Chinese cemeteries